The Essential Collection 1995–2005 is a compilation studio album released by the melodic hard rock band Ten. The double compact disc is a re-recording of songs from the Ten catalog, the original versions being available on previous releases. The new versions were recorded by the personnel listed below.

According to Ten leader Gary Hughes, "The tracks included are completely fresh recordings of the songs and more in keeping with the way the current line-up play the material, with new ideas on the old themes."

Track listing
All songs written by Gary Hughes.

Disc one - Rockers
 "The Name of the Rose/Wildest Dreams" – 14:03
 "The March of the Argonauts/Fear the Force" – 7:53
 "Ten Fathoms Deep" – 7:10
 "Apparition" – 8:46
 "After the Love Has Gone" – 5:52
 "Remembrance For the Brave/Red"  – 8:08
 "Spellbound" – 5:16
 "The Robe" – 10:09
 "Evermore" – 4:48

Disc two - Ballads
 "Till the End of Time" – 5:03
 "You're In My Heart" – 6:31
 "Yesterday Lies In the Flames" – 5:18
 "Virtual Reality" – 5:55
 "We Rule the Night" – 5:36
 "Silent Rain" – 6:12
 "Through the Fire" – 6:56
 "Sail Away" – 5:12
 "Rainbow In the Dark" – 5:25
 "Valentine" – 6:07
Tracks listed are for the Asian version; the European version (FR CD 272) omits track 9 on disc two.

Personnel
Gary Hughes – vocals
Chris Francis – lead guitars
John Halliwell – rhythm guitars
Paul Hodson – keyboards
Steve McKenna – bass guitar
Lee Morris – drums

Production
Mixing – Gary Hughes
Engineering – Gary Hughes, Roger Smith, Simon Brayshaw, Chris Francis, Paul Hodson, John Halliwell and Mark Sumner

References

External links
Heavy Harmonies page

Ten (band) albums
2005 compilation albums
Albums produced by Gary Hughes